Union Football Club d'Ixelles was a Belgian football club that took part in the first Belgian Championship in 1895. They finished 7th and therefore last in the league, which resulted in their relegation, and they were never able to return to the top flight. The club then dissolved in 1901.

References
Belgian football clubs history
RSSSF Archive

Union Ixelles
Association football clubs established in 1892
Association football clubs disestablished in 1901
1892 establishments in Belgium
1901 disestablishments in Belgium
Defunct football clubs in Belgium
Belgian Pro League clubs